The 2015 Boca Raton Bowl was a post-season American college football bowl game that was played on December 22, 2015 at FAU Stadium on the campus of Florida Atlantic University in Boca Raton, Florida. It was one of the 2015–16 bowl games that concluded the 2015 FBS football season. The second edition of the Boca Raton Bowl featured the Mid-American Conference West Division co–champion Toledo Rockets against the American Athletic Conference East Division champion Temple Owls. The game began at 7:00 p.m. EST and aired on ESPN.  Sponsored by the Marmot outdoor clothing and sporting goods company, the game was officially known as the Marmot Boca Raton Bowl.

Teams
The game featured the Temple Owls against the Toledo Rockets.

Temple Owls

Toledo Rockets

The Boca Raton Bowl was the first game for new head coach Jason Candle. Candle replaced Matt Campbell, who accepted a new head coaching job at Iowa State.

Game summary

Scoring summary

Source:

Statistics

References

External links
 Box score at ESPN

Boca Raton Bowl
Boca Raton Bowl
Temple Owls football bowl games
Toledo Rockets football bowl games
Boca Raton Bowl
December 2015 sports events in the United States